The Governor of Corrientes is a citizen of Corrientes Province, in Argentina, holding the office of governor for the corresponding period. The governor is elected alongside a vice-governor. Currently the governor of Corrientes is Gustavo Valdés, of the Radical Civic Union.

Governors since 1983

See also
 List of provincial legislatures in Argentina

References

Corrientes
Corrientes Province